Complement factor H-related protein 5 is a protein that in humans is encoded by the CFHR5 gene.

Function
CFHR5 is structurally related to complement factor H which plays an important role in the regulation of a branch of the innate immune system called the alternative complement pathway. Like complement factor H, CFHR5 is able to bind to complement C3.

Clinical Significance
A mutation in CHFR5 was found in patients with the disease CFHR5 nephropathy, which is a common cause of renal disease in Cyprus. The mutated form of the protein found in patients with this disease has impaired ability to bind to complement C3, suggesting that CFHR5 is important in protecting the kidneys from attack by the complement system.

References

External links
  GeneReviews/NCBI/NIH/UW entry on Dense Deposit Disease/Membranoproliferative Glomerulonephritis Type II

Further reading